Julie Anthony may refer to:

 Julie Anthony (singer) (born 1949), Australian soprano
 Julie Anthony (tennis) (born 1948), American tennis player